Katheryn Winnick (born December 17, 1977) is a Canadian actress. She is known for her starring roles in the television series Vikings (2013–2020), Wu Assassins (2019), and Big Sky (2020–present), and her recurring role on the television series Bones (2010–2011). She also starred in the films Amusement (2008), Choose (2010), A Glimpse Inside the Mind of Charles Swan III (2012),  The Art of the Steal (2013), Polar (2019), and The Marksman (2021).

Early life 
Winnick was born in Etobicoke, Ontario, and is of Ukrainian descent. She spoke Ukrainian as her first language and did not begin speaking English until she was eight years old. She began training in martial arts at age seven, and obtained her first black belt at 13. By age 21, she had started three Taekwondo schools. She taught Taekwondo and self-defense to actors while completing her degree in kinesiology at York University, Toronto. Winnick studied at and is an alumna of the William Esper Studio.

Winnick started acting as a young girl at her community center in Toronto. She had directed plays in her high school and won a scholarship for drama and directing while attending Richview Collegiate Institute.

Career

Winnick entered the film industry by teaching martial arts to actors on movie sets; the experience inspired her to pursue professional acting. She was then cast as a series regular on Student Bodies.

Since then, she has appeared in many films, including Stand Up Guys, Failure to Launch, Love & Other Drugs, and Killers. She has guest-starred in numerous television shows, most notably House, The Glades, Bones, Law & Order, Law & Order: Criminal Intent, CSI, CSI: NY, CSI: Miami, Criminal Minds, Person of Interest, and Nikita. In Bones, she portrayed Hannah Burley, a war correspondent who had been posted to cover the war in Afghanistan and becomes a love interest for main character Seeley Booth.

Winnick starred in the comedy-drama film Cold Souls, which had its world premiere at the Sundance Film Festival 2009. In 2011, she was cast in a guest role on The CW's spy drama Nikita. In 2013, she starred in A Glimpse Inside the Mind of Charles Swan III and appeared in the comedy The Art of the Steal. She also joined History Channel's Vikings, starring in the role of Lagertha, a legendary figure in Viking history. In July 2017, Winnick stated on her Twitter account that she had been cast for a role in what was thought to be a film project, and that it would be announced at the San Diego Comic-Con International. She was later revealed to be cast as a main character in the Nazi Zombies mode of the video game Call of Duty: WWII.

In July 2018, it was announced that Winnick had been cast in the series regular role of Christine "C.G." Gavin on the Netflix series, Wu Assassins. In February 2020, Winnick was announced to play the starring role of Jenny Hoyt on the ABC crime drama series Big Sky.

Personal life
Winnick stated she is an American citizen as well as a Canadian citizen.

In November 2022, the Russian Ministry of Foreign Affairs banned Winnick from entering Russia as well as 99 other Canadians in response to Western sanctions.

Filmography

Film

Television

Video games

 Call of Duty: WWII (2017), as Marie Fischer

As a director

 Wu Assassins (2019), episode: "Legacy"
 Vikings (2020), episode: "Valhalla Can Wait"

Awards and nominations

References

External links

 
 The Winnick Foundation Katheryn Winnick's organization

1977 births
Living people
20th-century Canadian actresses
21st-century Canadian actresses
Actresses from Toronto
Canadian female taekwondo practitioners
Canadian film actresses
Canadian people of Ukrainian descent
Canadian television actresses
People from Etobicoke
William Esper Studio alumni
York University alumni